Rhodanthemum hosmariense, the Moroccan daisy, is a species of flowering plant in the family Asteraceae, native to the Atlas Mountains of Morocco.

It is suitable for cultivation in an alpine garden or alpine house, where it is useful as groundcover. It has gained the Royal Horticultural Society's Award of Garden Merit.

Taxonomy
This is one of a group of plants which have been intensively studied, with considerable debate as to their correct parentage. As a result, an unusually large number of synonyms exists, including the following:-

References

Flora of Africa
Flora of Morocco
Anthemideae